The Most Illustrious (Spanish: Ilustrísimo Señor (male) or Ilustrísima Señora (female), literally "Illustrious Sir/Mister") is an honorific prefix that is traditionally applied to certain people in Spain and certain Spanish-speaking countries. It is a lower version of the prefix The Most Excellent (Excelentísimo/a Señor/a), and was traditionally applied to non-Grandee titled nobles in Spain, but is now used for a series of other offices.

In the Kingdom of Spain
The following State and Government officials receive the style "The Most Illustrious":

Constitutional court and judiciary
 The President of the Economic Administrative Central Court
 The Lawyers of the Spanish Council of State

Central government
 The Finance Delegates

Local authorities
 The Headmasters of Secondary State Schools

Diplomacy
 The Embassy Counsellors
 The Ministers Plenipotentiary of 3rd class

Other institutions
 The Director of the Spanish Academy of Rome
 The Director of the Spanish Agency of Data Protection

Nobility
Non-Grandee titleholders, their spouses and heirs
Non-firstborn children of Grandees

Other countries
Reference to a Duke in the UK's upper house of Parliament The House of Lords historically employed the prefix "the illustrious Duke" in the late 1800s.  In the 21st century, it has been replaced by the generic prefix "the noble Duke" which is customarily used for all members of the House of Lords, irrespective of their rank.
In other countries, "The Most Illustrious" is rarely used, but rather "Illustrious Highness"

See also
The Most Excellent

Notes

Titles in Spain
Styles (forms of address)
Superlatives